Lesbian, gay, bisexual, and transgender (LGBT) persons in Nigeria face legal and social challenges not experienced by non-LGBT residents. LGBT rights are generally infringed upon and homosexuality is illegal in Nigeria and punishable by up to 14 years of prison in the conventional court system. There is no legal protection for LGBT rights in Nigeria—a largely conservative country of more than 225 million people, split between a mainly Muslim north and a largely Christian south. Very few LGBT persons are open about their sexual orientation, as violence against them is frequent. Many LGBTQ Nigerians are fleeing to countries with progressive law to seek protection.

Same sex sexual relationships are illegal in Nigeria. The maximum punishment in the 12 northern states that have adopted Shari'a law is death by stoning. That law applies to all Muslims and to those who have voluntarily consented to application of the Shari'a courts. In southern Nigeria and under the secular criminal laws of northern Nigeria, the maximum punishment for same-sex sexual activity is 14 years' imprisonment. The Same-Sex Marriage Prohibition Act criminalises all forms of same-sex unions and same-sex marriage throughout the country.

According to the 2007 Pew Global Attitudes Project, 97% of Nigerian residents believe that homosexuality is a way of life that society should not accept, which was the second-highest rate of non-acceptance in the 45 countries surveyed. In 2015, a survey by an organisation founded by a Nigerian homosexual activist based in London claimed this percentage decreased to 94%. In this survey by Bisi Alimi, as of the same period the percentage of Nigerians who agree LGBT persons should receive education, healthcare, and housing is 30%. The level of disapproval declined slightly to 91% in another Pew Research Center poll in 2019.

Legality of same-sex sexual activity

Federal Republic of Nigeria

Criminal law

Federal Criminal Code in all southern states
Sex acts between men are illegal under the Criminal Code that applies to southern Nigeria and carry a maximum penalty of 14 years' imprisonment. Sex acts between women are not mentioned specifically in the code, although it is arguable that the gender-neutral term "person" in Section 214 of the code includes women. Chapter 21 of that code provides in pertinent part as follows:

Section 214.
Any person who –
(a) has carnal knowledge of any person against the order of nature; or (c) permits a male person to have carnal knowledge of him or her against the order of nature; is guilty of a felony, and is liable to imprisonment for fourteen years.
Section 215.
Any person who attempts to commit any of the offences defined in the last preceding section is guilty of a felony and is liable to imprisonment for seven years. The offender cannot be arrested without a warrant.

Section 217.
Any male person who, whether in public or private, commits any act of gross indecency with another male person, or procures another male person to commit any act of gross indecency with him, or attempts to procure the commission of any such act by any male person with himself or with another male person, whether in public or private, is guilty of a felony and is liable to imprisonment for three years. The offender cannot be arrested without a warrant.

Federal Penal Code in all northern states

Section 284 of the Penal Code (Northern States) Federal Provisions Act, which applies to all states in northern Nigeria, provides that:
Whoever has carnal intercourse against the order of nature with any man, woman or animal shall be punished with imprisonment for a term which may extend to fourteen years and shall also be liable to fine.

Section 405 provides that a male person who dresses or is attired in the fashion of a woman in a public place or who practises sodomy as a means of livelihood or as a profession is a "vagabond". Under Section 407, the punishment is a maximum of one year's imprisonment or a fine, or both.

Section 405 also provides that an "incorrigible vagabond" is "any person who after being convicted as a vagabond commits any of the offences which will render him liable to be convicted as such again". The punishment under Section 408 is a maximum of two years' imprisonment or a fine, or both.

Shari'a law enacted by certain northern states
Twelve northern states have adopted some form of Shari'a into their criminal statutes: Bauchi, Borno, Gombe, Jigawa, Kaduna, Kano, Katsina, Kebbi, Niger, Sokoto, Yobe, and Zamfara. The Shari'a criminal laws apply to those who voluntarily consent to the jurisdiction of the Shari'a courts and to all Muslims.

Meaning of sodomy

In the states of Kaduna and Yobe, "sodomy" is committed by "[w]hoever has anal coitus with any man".

In the states of Kano and Katsina, "sodomy" is committed by "[w]hoever has carnal intercourse against the order of nature with any man or woman through her rectum".

In the states of Bauchi, Gombe, Jigawa, Sokoto, and Zamfara, "sodomy" is committed by "[w]hoever has carnal intercourse against the order of nature with any man or woman".

Punishment for offence of sodomy

In the states of Gombe, Jigawa, Zamfara, and Kano, an unmarried person who commits the offence of sodomy shall be punished with "caning of one hundred lashes" and imprisonment for the length of one year.  If married, the punishment for committing sodomy is execution by stoning (rajm).  In Kano, death by stoning also applies if one has previously been married.

In the state of Bauchi, a person who commits the offence of sodomy shall be punished with stoning to death (rajm) or by any other means decided by the state.

In the states of Kaduna, Katsina, Kebbi, and Yobe, a person who commits the offence of sodomy shall be punished with stoning to death (rajm).

In the state of Sokoto, a person who commits the offence of sodomy shall be punished with stoning to death. If a minor commits the act on an adult, the minor faces correctional punishment and the adult faces punishment by way of ta'azir which may extend to 100 lashes. In Sokoto, ta'azir means a discretionary punishment for offence whose punishment is not specified.

Meaning of lesbianism

In the states of Bauchi, Gombe, Jigawa, Kaduna, Kano, Katsina, Kebbi, Sokoto, Yobe, and Zamfara, lesbianism is committed by "[w]hoever, being a woman, engages another woman in carnal intercourse through her sexual organ or by means of stimulation or sexual excitement of one another." Bauchi, Jigawa, Katsina, Kebbi, Sokoto, Yobe and Zamfara states include the following official explanation: "the offence is committed by the unnatural fusion of the female sexual organs and/or by the use of natural or artificial means to stimulate or attain sexual satisfaction or excitement."

Punishment for offence of lesbianism

In the states of Gombe, Jigawa, Kebbi, Sokoto, Yobe, Zamfara, and Bauchi, a person who is found guilty of committing this offence will be subject to punishment by caning which could last up to fifty lashings. Additionally, any persons convicted of committing lesbianism face imprisonment lasting up to six months, except for in Bauchi, where imprisonment may last up to five years.

In the state of Kaduna, the punishment for committing the offence of lesbianism is ta'azir, which means "any punishment not provided for by way of hadd or qisas".  "Hadd" means "punishment that is fixed by Islamic law". "Qisas" includes "punishments inflicted upon offenders by way of retaliation for causing death/injuries to a person".

In the states of Kano and Katsina, the punishment for committing the offence of lesbianism is stoning to death.

Meaning of gross indecency

In the state of Kaduna, a person commits an act of gross indecency if they expose themselves naked in public or perform other related acts of similar nature that are capable of corrupting public morals.

In the states of Kano and Katsina, the definition of gross indecency is the same as the state of Kaduna, however, the law includes kissing in public.

In the state of Gombe, a person commits an act of gross indecency by committing "any sexual offence against the normal or usual standards of behaviour".

The states of Bauchi, Jigawa, Kebbi, Sokoto, Yobe, and Zamfara do not define gross indecency. Their laws instead say: "Whoever commits an act of gross indecency upon the person of another without his consent or by the use of force or threat compels a person to join with him in the commission of such act shall be punished".

Punishment for offence of gross indecency

A person who commits the offence of gross indecency "shall be punished with caning which may extend to forty lashes and may be liable to imprisonment for a term not exceeding one year and may also be liable to fine".  In the state of Bauchi, imprisonment may last for a term of up to seven years.

In the state of Kaduna, the punishment for committing the offence of gross indecency is ta'azir, which means "any punishment not provided for by way of hadd or qisas". "Hadd" means "punishment that is fixed by Islamic law". "Qisas" includes "punishments inflicted upon offenders by way of retaliation for causing death/injuries to a person".

In the state of Sokoto, a person who commits the offence of gross indecency "shall be punished with caning which may extend to forty lashes or may be liable to imprisonment for a term not exceeding one year, or both, and may also be liable to fine".

Meanings of vagabond and incorrigible vagabond

In the states of Bauchi, Gombe, Jigawa, Kaduna, Kano, Katsina, Kebbi, Sokoto, Yobe, and Zamfara, a male is deemed a vagabond should they dress in the fashion of a woman in a public place or who practices sodomy as a means of work or profession.

In the states of Kano and Katsina, they describe a female as a vagabond as a female who wears male clothes or is attired like a man in a public place.

In the states of Bauchi, Gombe, Jigawa, Kaduna, Kano, Katsina, Kebbi, Sokoto, Yobe, and Zamfara, an "incorrigible vagabond" is any person who behaves as a vagabond again after already being convicted as one.

Punishment for being a vagabond or incorrigible vagabond

In the states of Bauchi, Gombe, Jigawa, Katsina, Kebbi, Sokoto, Yobe, and Zamfara, a person convicted as being a vagabond faces imprisonment lasting up to one year and caning extending up to thirty lashes. In the state of Kano, imprisonment may not exceed eight months and caning may extend to thirty-five lashes.

In the state of Kaduna, the punishment for being convicted as a vagabond or as an incorrigible vagabond is ta'azir, which means "any punishment not provided for by way of hadd or qisas". "Hadd" means "punishment that is fixed by Islamic law". "Qisas" includes "punishments inflicted upon offenders by way of retaliation for causing death/injuries to a person".

In the states of Gombe, Jigawa, Katsina, Kebbi, Sokoto, Yobe, and Zamfara, a person convicted as being an incorrigible vagabond faces imprisonment lasting up to two years and caning extending up to fifty lashes. In the state of Bauchi, caning may not exceed forty lashes, and in the state of Kano, imprisonment may not exceed one year.

Secular criminal law enacted by certain northern states

Same-sex sexual activities

In the state of Bormo, a person who "engages in ... lesbianism, homosexual act ... in the State commits an offence". A person who "engages in sexual intercourse with another person of the same gender shall upon conviction be punished with death".

Males imitating the behavioural attitudes of women

In the state of Kano, a person who "being a male gender who acts, behaves or dresses in a manner which imitate the behavioural attitude of women shall be guilty of an offence and upon conviction, be sentenced to 1 year imprisonment or a fine of N10,000 or both".

Recognition of same-sex relationships

On 18 January 2007, the cabinet of Nigeria approved the Same Sex Marriage (Prohibition) Act 2006 and sent it to the National Assembly for urgent action. The bill, however, did not pass.

On 29 November 2011, the Senate of Nigeria passed the "Same Sex Marriage (Prohibition) Bill, 2011". The bill was passed on 30 May 2013 by the House of Representatives of Nigeria. If signed into law by President Goodluck Jonathan, the bill would:
 make a marriage contract or civil union entered into between persons of the same sex "invalid and illegal and ... not recognized as entitled to the benefits of a valid marriage"
 make void and unenforceable in Nigeria a marriage contract or civil union entered into between persons of the same sex by virtue of a certificate issued by a foreign country
 prohibit the solemnization of any marriage or civil union entered into between persons of the same sex "in any place of worship either Church or Mosque or any other place or whatsoever called in Nigeria"
 prohibit the registration of "gay clubs, societies and organisations, their sustenance, processions and meetings"
 prohibit the "public show of same sex amorous relationship directly or indirectly"
 make a person who enters into a same sex marriage contract or civil union liable for 14 years' imprisonment
 make a person who "registers, operates or participates in gay clubs, societies and organisation, or directly or indirectly make public show of same sex amorous relationship in Nigeria" liable for 10 years' imprisonment
 make a person or group of persons that "witness, abet and aids the solemnization of a same sex marriage or civil union, or supports the registration, operation and sustenance of gay clubs, societies, organisations, processions or meetings in Nigeria" liable for 10 years' imprisonment
 define "civil union" for purposes of this law to mean "any arrangement between persons of the same sex to live together as sex partners, and ... include such descriptions as adult independent relationships, caring partnerships, civil partnerships, civil solidarity pacts, domestic partnerships, reciprocal beneficiary relationships, registered partnerships, significant relationships, stable unions, etc."

On 7 January 2014, the president of Nigeria, Goodluck Jonathan, signed into law the Same-Sex Marriage Prohibition Act, which parliament passed in May 2013. The law follows a similar one passed in Uganda in December 2013, which imposes life imprisonment for some types of homosexual acts.

Anti-discrimination protections

The Constitution of the Federal Republic of Nigeria does not specifically protect LGBT rights, but it does contain various provisions guaranteeing all citizens equal rights (Section 17(2)(a)) as well as other rights, including adequate medical and health care (Section 17(3)(d)) and equal opportunity in the workplace (Section 17(3)(a)).

There is no enacted legislation protecting against discrimination or harassment based on sexual orientation or gender identity.  None of the political parties in Nigeria has formally endorsed LGBT rights. Two of the most successful political parties in the National Assembly, the People's Democratic Party and the All Nigeria Peoples Party, are overtly hostile to LGBT rights.  Smaller, more liberal political parties have also spoken against LGBT rights.

Living conditions
Nigeria is considered a conservative country. There is demonstrated public hostility towards same-sex relationships. In addition to legal punishment, openly homosexual citizens are subject to public aggression and violence. 

On 12 September 2008, four newspapers published the names and addresses of twelve members of the House of rainbow Metropolitan Church, an LGBT-friendly church in Lagos. Some of these members were threatened, beaten and stoned by members of the public. Following these incidents the church cancelled conferences for concerns about the safety of attendees. In August 2007, eighteen men were arrested by Bauchi state police and charged with sodomy for dressing as women, which is illegal under Shari’a penal code.  These charges were later dropped to vagrancy, and the men were held in jail for several years waiting for trial — which eventually dissolved by the end of 2011.

Some organizations in Nigeria try to assist LGBT persons, such as the Metropolitan Community Churches. Affiliation with these groups may place individuals at risk of violence or abuse.  

The U.S. Department of State's 2011 Human Rights Report found,

Because of widespread societal taboos against homosexuality, very few persons openly revealed their orientation. The [non-governmental organizations] ... Global Rights and The Independent Project provided lesbian, gay, bisexual, and transgender (LGBT) groups with legal advice and training in advocacy, media responsibility, and HIV/AIDS awareness. 

On 15 April 2017, authorities in the state of Kaduna arrested 53 men for allegedly conspiring to attend a same-sex wedding.  The accused were charged with conspiracy, unlawful assembly, and belonging to an unlawful society.

Lagos State arrested 42 men for homosexuality in August 2017. In June 2018, the Nigerian police arrested more than 100 party-goers at a hotel in Asaba, Delta State, on charges that they were gays and lesbians. By July 2018, they were facing homosexuality-related charges in court.

In January 2019, Dolapo Badmos, the spokesperson for the Lagos State Police Command, warned homosexuals to flee the country or face prosecution. She stated in an Instagram post: Any persons that are homosexually orientated should leave Nigeria or risk facing prosecution. Dolapo Badmos continues to state that there are laws in Nigeria that forbid homosexual clubs, associations and organisations where anyone found to be associated with these could be penalised up to 15 years in jail.

Nigeria's Ambassador to the UN's views

In a statement dated 19 September 2006, the Nigerian ambassador to the United Nations, Joseph Ayalogu, stated, "The notion that executions for offences such as homosexuality and lesbianism [are] ... excessive is judgemental rather than objective. What may be seen by some as disproportional penalty in such serious offences and odious conduct may be seen by others as appropriate and just punishment."

Summary table

See also

Bobrisky, a prominent transgender woman in Nigeria
Human rights in Nigeria
 LGBT rights in Africa
 LGBT rights in Northern Nigeria
 Recognition of same-sex unions in Nigeria
 Death penalty for homosexuality

Notes

References

External links

Human Rights Watch report on the impact of the Same Sex Marriage (Prohibition) Act on LGBT Nigerians
UK government travel advice for Nigeria: Local laws and customs

 
Human rights in Nigeria
Law of Nigeria
Politics of Nigeria